Georgina Sherrington (born 26 July 1985) is an English actress.

Biography 
Sherrington is best known for her portrayal of the character of Mildred Hubble in the children's series The Worst Witch (1998–2001), as well as the spin-off series Weirdsister College - The further Adventures of The Worst Witch (2001), a British/Canadian co-production between ITV and TV Ontario, screened on HBO in North America, ABC in Australia, and on various other networks worldwide. In 2000 she won a Young Artist Award for Best Performance in a TV Comedy Series - Leading Young Actress for her work in The Worst Witch.

Sherrington relocated back to London in 2010 after spending time in the Los Angeles area. She currently works at the BBC in the Drama Commissioning team.

She has three younger brothers.

Filmography

Personal life

She was a student at Wimbledon High School, London, and graduated from Princeton University in 2008, where she was a member of Princeton Tower Club. At Princeton, she directed Love's Labours Lost in April 2006 and a Shakespeare Festival in 2007, and served as director, assistant director, and actress in various productions in 2007, including The Winter's Tale. In October 2020, Sherrington announced on her Instagram, she was pregnant with her first child, a boy who was born in February 2021 with her long term London style icon partner Jeremy Boote.

References

External links
 Official Website

1985 births
Living people
Actresses from London
English female models
People educated at Wimbledon High School
English film actresses
English child actresses
20th-century English actresses
21st-century English actresses
English television actresses
English Shakespearean actresses